Nathalie Housset Gilbert (born 29 July 1968) is a French former professional tennis player.

A right-handed player, Housset had a career best singles ranking of 158 in the world. She won a $25,000 ITF tournament in Le Havre in 1990, beating countrywoman Nathalie Herreman in the final.

Housset reached the second round of both the Australian Open and French Open in 1992. At the French Open, after winning her first round match over Wang Shi-ting 9–7 in the third set, she was beaten in the second round by eventual finalist Steffi Graf. Her best grand slam performance came in the mixed doubles at the 1991 French Open, with future husband Rodolphe Gilbert as her partner.

ITF finals

Singles: 1 (1–0)

References

External links
 
 

1968 births
Living people
French female tennis players